The 3000 series (3000系) is a type of monorail train manufactured by Hitachi operated on the Osaka Monorail since 2018.

Interior 
The interior was designed with comfort and openness in mind, such as larger windows. At the rear of the lead car is a "Kids Zone" for children to play.

References 

Monorails in Japan
Rail transport in Osaka Prefecture
Train-related introductions in 2018
Hitachi multiple units
1500 V DC multiple units of Japan